The Battle of Tornavento was a battle fought in Northwest Italy on 22 June 1636 during the Thirty Years' War.

Prelude 

In 1636, Cardinal Richelieu had persuaded the Duke of Savoy (Vittorio Amedeo I) to launch an offensive on the Spanish Duchy of Milan. A French Army crossed the Ticino river between Oleggio and Lonate Pozzolo, but was checked by a larger Spanish army, and dug in to await their Savoyard allies.

Battle
On 22 June the Spanish attacked, but were held back after the arrival of the army of Victor Amadeus I, Duke of Savoy. Fighting in the summer heat was savage and bloody, in a heathland described by Spanish officers as "sin àrbol, y con falta de agua" ("treeless, and lacking water"). The fighting startedat 8:00 AM. The Spanish made several attacks on the Franco-Savoyard line, which was fortified on a slope. Both sides dug trenches and threw up earthworks, with fighting often devolving into scattered local exchanges of gunfire punctuated by intense bouts of melee combat. By the evening, the Spanish had been repulsed and the Franco-Savoyards retook all positions, leading to the dug-in sides exchanging gunfire for prolonged periods to little effect. Infrequent fighting continued after sundown. There were high casualties on both side until Leganés, seeing little chance of dislodging a numerically inferior but well entrenched enemy, decided to preserve his army by withdrawing under the cover of darkness. In order to ensure he was not pursued while vulnerable, Leganés  had soldiers align hundreds of pikes in the ground behind their own entrenchments to give the impression that they were held in force, and then set hundreds of muskets alongside them, with their lit wicks glowing in the darkness. He also instructed a detachment of dragoons be left behind as the rearguard to prowl along the enemy line and fire all night long into the darkness. The retreat was a success, and the Spanish withdrew without the loss of any baggage or cannons. Victor-Amadeus and Créquy, characterizing their armies as exhausted and considering it "miraculous" that they had managed to repel the Spanish assaults, chose not to press another attack.

Aftermath
The Spanish abandoned the battlefield and retired to Boffalora. The Franco-Savoyard army remained some days near Tornavento, sacking nearby towns and damaging a canal, but decided to conduct a withdrawal from Milanese territory. Little had been achieved with this battle and the invasion of Lombardy turned out to be a complete failure.

The battle lasted about 14 hours in total. In that time the Franco-Savoyard army alone, composed of 2/3 musketeers and arquebusiers, expended 30,000 pounds of gunpowder firing some 675,000 bullets.

Reenactment 

Every year in the hamlet of Tornavento a colourful and spectacular reenactment of the battle is held by volunteers, clothed and armed with uniforms and weapons in use at that time, from pike to musket and cannon.

References

Citations

Bibliography
 
 Hanlon, Gregory. "Italia 1636: Sepolcro degli eserciti", LEG Edizioni (2018)
 Thion, Stéphane. French Armies of the Thirty years War Lrt Publishing (2008)

External links 
 Chronology (in english)
Chronology (in italian)

Battles involving France
Battles involving Spain
Battles of the Thirty Years' War
Conflicts in 1636
1636 in Italy
Oleggio